Gossy is the fourth studio album by English singer-songwriter Matt Goss. It was released in 2009 by TMG Records and featured the hit single Firefly which was remixed by Paul Oakenfold< and went straight to #1 in the world trance charts. The album was produced, mixed, written and financed completely by Matt Goss and features the tracks Evil which tied in with his Vegas residency and Change Me which was later recorded by Akon and Keri Hilson.

References 

2009 albums
Matt Goss albums